Isabelle Raimond-Pavero (born 23 February 1961) is a French politician of The Republicans party. She became a senator for Indre-et-Loire in October 2017.

Career
She was the 4th deputy mayor of Chinon, Indre-et-Loire from 2014 to 2017 and a member of the community of communes of Chinon, Vienne et Loire.

In March 2015, she was elected a departmental councillor of the canton of Chinon with Éric Loizon. She was appointed a deputy chairwoman of the departmental council of Indre-et-Loire.

On September 24th, 2017, she was elected a senator for Indre-et-Loire.

References

External links
Isabelle Raimond-Pavero, Indre-et-Loire departmental council 
Isabelle Raimond-Pavero, French Senate official website 
Isabelle Raimond-Pavero, NosSénateurs.fr 

21st-century French women politicians
French Senators of the Fifth Republic
Senators of Indre-et-Loire
Women members of the Senate (France)
Politicians from Centre-Val de Loire
The Republicans (France) politicians
1961 births
Living people